The 12457 / 12458 Bikaner–Delhi Sarai Rohilla Superfast Express is a Superfast Express train belonging to Indian Railways – North Western Railway zone that runs between Bikaner Junction and  in India.

It operates as train number 12458 from Bikaner Junction to Delhi Sarai Rohilla and as train number 12457 in the reverse direction serving the states of Rajasthan, Haryana and Delhi.

Coaches

The 12458 / 57 Bikaner–Delhi Sarai Rohilla Superfast Express has 1 AC 1st Class cum AC 2 tier, 1 AC 2 tier, 3 AC 3 tier, 7 Sleeper Class, 6 Unreserved/General & 2 Seating cum Luggage Rake Coaches. It does not carry a pantry car.

As is customary with most train services in India, coach composition may be amended at the discretion of Indian Railways depending on demand.

Service

As the average speed of the train is above , as per Indian Railway rules, its fare includes a Superfast surcharge.

Routeing

The 12458 / 57 Bikaner–Delhi Sarai Rohilla Superfast Express runs from Bikaner Junction via Sri Dungargarh, Loharu,  to Delhi Sarai Rohilla.

This train is different from the 12455/56 Delhi Sarai Rohilla–Bikaner Superfast Express which is operated by Northern Railways and runs via Sri Ganganagar Junction railway station utilising LHB coach.

Traction

As large sections of the route are yet to be fully electrified, a Bhagat Ki Kothi-based WDP-4 / WDP-4B / WDP-4D locomotive powers the train for its entire journey.

See also 

 Delhi Sarai Rohilla railway station
 Bikaner Junction railway station
 Delhi Sarai Rohilla–Bikaner Superfast Express
 Bikaner–Delhi Sarai Rohilla Intercity Express
 Salasar Express

References

External links

Transport in Bikaner
Transport in Delhi
Express trains in India
Rail transport in Rajasthan
Rail transport in Haryana
Rail transport in Delhi
Railway services introduced in 2011